Guriel District  is one of the districts in the central Galguduud region of Somalia.
Its capital is Guriel

Villages, towns, and cities
Guriel district has 120 villages, towns and city.

List of villages, towns and the city of Guriel of Guriel district.

 Guriel (Capital)
 Wara-Dhumale 
 El Dhere
 Dhagahyale
 Diriye hasan 
 Doyale
 Cali hasan  
 Barlef
 Dabare
 Cali Jir
 Godwil
 Iluule
 Ramale
 El Baraf
 Gala-qoryale
 Bulbul
 Kora goys
 Habar-Cirir
 Ina Cabad
 Baa
 Guled bogcad
 Gofado
 Xajinle
 Dabayodley
 Lanle
 Marodile
 Labiley
 Yanyaley
 El-habred
 Benyaley
 Dhanforaris
 Qotalo
 Balihowd
 balidaqaf
 Xabadale
 Alalale
 Foley
 Marere
 Jicle
 Xersi lugey
 Dumaye
 Ilix
 Afcegag
 Bar Siyable
 Tosan Dher
 Sina Dhaqo
 Labi Dulle
 Isma Dhaqo
 lamo Fanax
 Tulo Cano
 Galqoryaale
 Yibirsuge
 Gabun
 Darood Ceynshe
 Qaydar
 Ribadle
 Lan Ijaabo
 Buhod
 Dabeyl
 Kadhakole
 Ariqarof
 Balli-Dhig
 Garasle
 Balli Sharaf
 Xodale
 Golangole
 Miiryahudle
 Idow
 Hertis
 Xulfadi axmed gurey
 Shed Gadud
 Cilmi Joowle 
 Dudubley
 Labi Hiraan 
 Dadale
 Odale 
 Balicad
 Cilmi jowle
 Lamo
 Walomoge
 Jora Jowhar 
 Salaxdhadhab
 Bobdhere
 Bole
 Dabare
 Bulo Shiikh
 Lebi Dulo
 Degayare
 Farmalagle
 Goragiahor
And many other villages, towns and cities.

Gallery

References

 http://allafrica.com/stories/201403080083.html

Districts of Somalia
Galguduud